Alain Borer (born 1949 in Luxeuil), is a French poet, art critic, essayist, novelist, playwright, writer-traveler, signatory of the Littérature-monde (world literature) manifesto, and eminent authority on the works of Arthur Rimbaud. He has been Professor of Art at L'École supérieure des beaux-arts de Tours since 1979 and Visiting Professor of French Literature at the University of Southern California since 2005. He received the Kessel Prize for his novel Koba (Seuil, 2002), as well as the 70th Prix Apollinaire for his play Icare & I don't (Seuil). In 2010, Borer was awarded the 10th Pierre Mac Orlan Prize for Le Ciel & la carte, carnet de voyage dans les mers du Sud à bord de La Boudeuse (Seuil), and the Maurice Genevoix Prize from the Académie Française in 2011. Alain Borer was made a Knight (1985), then Officer (1993) of Arts and Letters in the French Legion of Honour, and is President of the Printemps des Poètes association. Alain Borer additionally received the Édouard Glissant Prize in 2005, awarded by the University of Paris VIII for all of his achievements.

Biography

Alain Borer grew up in Luxeuil-les-Bains (Franche-Comté), before moving to Geneva to study at the Institut Florimont (1965–69), Nancy (Lycée Poincaré, 1970), Paris (Lycée Henri IV, 1971), the University of Paris (Université Paris Diderot) and Paris X-Nanterre.  He lived for some time in Croatia (1974–80), and Rome (1986–89). He resides in the French town of Chaumussay, in Touraine.

Works

The name of Alain Borer is associated with that of Arthur Rimbaud, to whom he has devoted thirty years of his life. Aged 17, Alain Borer directed Le Bateau ivre, a student journal at the Institut Florimont in Geneva; aged 27 he travelled to Harar in Ethiopia (the same age as Rimbaud was when he arrived here) as part of a film-making expedition with Léo Ferré (the film "Le Voleur de feu" was aired on French television in 1978). Alain Borer is the author of two books which have become classic references in Rimbaud studies; an album-book Un sieur Rimbaud, se disant négociant, with Philippe Soupault (Lachenal & Ritter, 1984), and his combined essay and travel journal Rimbaud en Abyssinie (Fiction & Cie, 1984, et Points-Seuil, 2004). Aged 37 (the age of Rimbaud's death), Alain Borer completed his book publications on the man with the "soles of wind"; Adieu à Rimbaud and L'Œuvre-vie, 1991, is an original monument of a publication marking the centenary of Rimbaud's death and which sheds considerable new light upon Rimbaud's universe, and which breathed considerable life into scholarship on the poet.

On reading the entirety of Rimbaud's work (the "rimbaldothèque") Alain Borer is not only the first to have traced the physical footsteps of Rimbaud's world journeys (in what he has termed the "Rimbaldie"), but also to have developed and forged the necessary concepts (the paradigm of the Oeuvre-Vie, "the major signifier") permitting him to theorize and unlock the secrets of "this wild parade" (Rimbaud, l'heure de la fuite, Gallimard, 1991, with an introduction by Hugo Pratt).

Alain Borer is also a novelist (Koba, Seuil, collection "Fiction & Cie"), art critic (Dürer, 1980, Chambord, Monum, Hugo Pratt, Casterman), particularly on Joseph Beuys (Joseph Beuys, published by the Centre Pompidou, 1994, and La Bibliothèque des Arts, Lausanne, 2001), essayist (Saint-Martin ou la coupabilité, musée de Tours), playwright (Paul des oiseaux, Le Chant du Rien visible, Fourbis, Le Quadrige invectif, Le cercle d'art, 2005, assembled together in Icare & I don't, Seuil, 2007), and world traveler and travel-writer (Sarajevo, Gallimard, Liberia, Michalon, Los Angeles, Phébus, Pacific Palisades; with a work on the Pacific Palisades due to be published by Seuil).

As a poet (Pour l'amour du ciel, CD Radio France, the Poétiques Collection), Alain Borer is joined by André Velter and Zéno Bianu in the Groupe Actéon. The group has three major preoccupations: an astrophysical obsession with "extreme travel" (Le Nuage de Magellan, Zone bleue), a "pataphysical" dimension (Bestiaire, Alexandrins fortuits), as well as poetic texts stripped to their bare essentials, which they have termed "noems" (Jeil, 2004, Loups plats, 2006).

After François Coupé (1973), Alain Borer has made "book-objects," collages (Calme, 1987), and numerous books in collaboration with artists (for example, on Touareg jewellery with Kaïdin), which he signs off under the pen name "Jaseur boreal." An exposition of his photographs, La Sanglinière, was presented in the château de Tours in April 2007.

It is poetry, however, which infuses all of Alain Borer's writings. His latest work, Icare & I don't (Seuil, 2007), "a metaphysical vaudeville," illustrates this rare alliance of poetry and wit, of lightness and depth, whose tone should give life to works of "allegro serioso" – a program about which Roland Barthes wrote: "With you, the art of living and the art of writing merge."
His work includes a number of prefaces to books and art catalogues, book collaborations and collaborative reviews; a recent catalogue [G. Tran Din Mahe, 2008] lists approximately one thousand publications by one hundred publishers, in addition to forty television programs (Apostrophes in 1984 et Bouillon de culture in 1991), about a hundred radio shows (principally on France Culture), two hundred and fifty conferences and public lectures in one hundred different towns and thirty universities in about thirty countries. His work is the subject of more than six hundred press articles.

Selected publications

In the USA
 Rimbaud in Abissinia. New York, William Morrow, 1991 
 The Essential Joseph Beuys, The MIT Press, Cambridge, Massachusetts, 1997 
Novels
 Koba, Éditions du Seuil. " Fiction & Cie ", 2002 (winner of 2003 Kessel prize) 
Theater
 Icare & I don't. Éditions du Seuil, 2007 (winner of 2008 Apollinaire prize) 
 Richard Mille, Le Cercle d'Art, 2005 
Essays on Rimbaud
 Rimbaud en Abyssinie, Éditions du Seuil, " Fiction & Cie ", 1984, re-published in 1991, Points-Seuil, 2004 
 Un sieur Rimbaud, se disant négociant… With Philippe Soupault, Arthur Aeschbacher and François Margolin, Lachenal & Ritter, 1984 (winner of the Académie française Essay prize, 1985) ; Re-published by Le Livre de Poche, Hachette, 1989, under the title, La Terre et les pierres 
 Rimbaud d'Arabie, Éditions du Seuil, " Fiction & Cie ", 1991
 Rimbaud, l'heure de la fuite, introduction by Hugo Pratt, coll. Découvertes Gallimard vol. 102, 1991, re-published in 2001 
 Rimbaud, by Enid Starkie, translation, preface and notes, Flammarion, 1982, re-published in 1989 
 Œuvre-vie, Édition du centenaire, Arléa, 1991
 Bouts rimés d'Arthur Rimbaud, drawings by Michel Gérard, the " Muro Torto " Collection, Rome, Villa Médicis, 1980
 Je me ressouviens, Fnac & Institut du Monde Arabe, 1991
 " Nothing de Rimbe ", Intervention/image by Ernest Pignon-Ernest, AREA, 1986, nouvelle édition La Nuée bleue, 1991
 Le lieu et la formule, Mercure de France, 1999
Essays on Art
 Déploration de Joseph Beuys, Bibliothèque des Arts, Lausanne, 2001
 Joseph Beuys, Cosac Naify Edições, 2001, 
 Chambord Les trois corps de Chambord, photographies de Dominic Hofbauer, Monum, éditions du patrimoine, 2006
 L'Œuvre-vie d'Hugo Pratt et son empire perdu : Éthiopie, La trace du scorpion, Casterman, 2005
Poetry
 François Coupé, SAFC-Encres Vives, 1973
 Bestiaire, " Les Poquettes volantes " Collection, La Louvière (Belgium), Daily-Bul, 1979
 Le Nuage de Magellan, I, gouaches by Georges Badin, Musée de Céret, 1980
 Le Nuage de Magellan, II, collage by Peter Briggs, Bruxelles, Bibliothèque Phantomas, 1983
 Zone bleue, La Chevelure de Bérénice ; Le Nuage de Magellan, extract III, drawings by Barbara von Thaden, Lachenal & Ritter, 1984
 Les Très Riches Heures de Chuck Berry, photomontages by Joël Hubaut, Éditions de la C.R.E.M., 1991
 Départs arrêtés, watercolors by Jean-Claude Vignes, Aréa, 1995
 Jeil, noèmes, Interventions de Pierre Zanzucchi, L'Échelle, Hôtel Beury, 2000
 Carte mère, noèmes, Vice-versa, 2002
 Loups plats, illustrated by Pierre Antoniucci, Georges Badin, Peter Briggs, Alain Gauvin, Christian Jaccard, Jacques Vimard, Pierre Zanzucchi, Rencontre, 2006
Audiovisual
 Paul Verlaine, told by Alain Borer. Cassettes Radio France, 1979
 Arthur Rimbaud, told by Alain Borer. Texts read by Laurent Terzieff, cassettes Radio France, 1978 and 1989
 Le Voleur de feu. Film directed by Charles Brabant. With Léo Ferré, TF1, 1978 and 1986
 Sur les terrasses de Rimbaud. Film directed by Saad Salman, Paris, Les Productions de La Lanterne, 1990
 Pour l'amour du ciel. Texts read by Alain Borer (book CD), Cassettes Radio France, 1996
Expositions
 Le Reste à voir, Hôtel Beury, L'Échelle, March 2006
 La Sanglinière (photographies), Château de Tours, 29 March – 27 April 2007

References

External links
 Official Site 
 Biography on the website of the Printemps des poètes 

People from Haute-Saône
1949 births
Living people
20th-century French poets
21st-century French poets
21st-century French male writers
20th-century French male writers
21st-century French dramatists and playwrights
Joseph Kessel Prize recipients
Prix Guillaume Apollinaire winners
Lycée Henri-IV alumni
French male poets